Steffen Weigold (born 9 April 1979) is a German former cyclist. He rode in the 2003 Giro d'Italia, but did not finish.

Major results
1999
 1st  Under-23 National Cyclo-cross Championships
 2nd Rund um die Hainleite
2000
 1st  Under-23 National Cyclo-cross Championships
2001
 3rd Overall Troféu Joaquim Agostinho
2006
 5th Druivenkoers-Overijse

References

1979 births
Living people
German male cyclists
People from Oberndorf am Neckar
Sportspeople from Freiburg (region)
Cyclists from Baden-Württemberg